Petronella Duncan is a South African politician, a former Member of Parliament with the Democratic Alliance, and the former Shadow Deputy Minister of Human Settlements.

Year of birth missing (living people)
Living people
Democratic Alliance (South Africa) politicians
Members of the National Assembly of South Africa
Members of the Western Cape Provincial Parliament
Women members of the National Assembly of South Africa
Women members of provincial legislatures of South Africa